The common whipping is the simplest type of whipping knot, a series of knots intended to stop a rope from unravelling. As it can slip off the rope easily, the common whipping should not be used for rope ends that will be handled. This whipping knot is also called 'wolf' whipping in some parts of the world. The 'Hangman's knot' is a variation of this whipping knot.

The benefit of a common whipping is that no tools are necessary and the rope does not need to be unlaid.  The problem is that it will slide off the end of the rope with little provocation.  Other whippings avoid this by interleaving the whipping with the strands of the rope and creating friction with the strands to avoid slipping.

Normally a natural fibre rope is whipped with twine. The size of the rope dictates the size of the twine. Any twine can be used, but tarred two strand hemp (marline) is preferred. Artificial-fibre ropes should have their ends fused by heat rather than whipped to prevent unravelling.

Process

See also
List of knots
Ropework

References

Further reading
 

Whipping knots